Murray Brodie (born 26 September 1950) is a Scottish former professional footballer who played as a midfielder, making over 400 career appearances.

Career
Born in Glasgow, Brodie played for Cumbernauld United, Leicester City, Aldershot and Basingstoke Town.

References

1950 births
Living people
Scottish footballers
Cumbernauld United F.C. players
Leicester City F.C. players
Aldershot F.C. players
Basingstoke Town F.C. players
English Football League players
Footballers from Glasgow
Association football midfielders